Ianna Rouzavina (born 23 September 1982) is a Russian foil fencer.

Rouzavina won the gold medal in the foil team event at the 2006 World Fencing Championships after beating Italy in the final. She accomplished this with her team mates Aida Shanayeva, Julia Khakimova and Svetlana Boyko. She also won the gold medal in the individual foil event at the 2006 European Seniors Fencing Championship.

After retiring as an athlete, Rouzavina continued her career as an international fencing referee on foil, refereeing at major international championships and tournaments.

References

1982 births
People from Kurchatov, Russia
Living people
Russian female foil fencers
Sportspeople from Kursk Oblast
World Fencing Championships medalists
21st-century Russian women